The first Negro National League (NNL) was one of the several Negro leagues that were established during the period in the United States when organized baseball was segregated. The league was formed in 1920 with former player Rube Foster as its president.

League history

Founding 

Led by Rube Foster, owner and manager of the Chicago American Giants, the NNL was established on February 13, 1920, by a coalition of team owners at a meeting in a Kansas City YMCA. The new league was the first African-American baseball circuit to achieve stability and last more than one season.  At first the league operated mainly in midwestern cities, ranging from Kansas City in the west to Pittsburgh in the east; in 1924 it expanded into the south, adding franchises in Birmingham, Alabama, and Memphis, Tennessee.

Competition 
The two most important east coast clubs, the Hilldale Club of Darby, Pennsylvania, and the Bacharach Giants of Atlantic City, were affiliated with the NNL as associate clubs from 1920 to 1922, but did not compete for the championship.  In 1923 they and four other eastern teams formed the Eastern Colored League (ECL) and raided the NNL for many of its top players, including John Henry Lloyd, Biz Mackey, George Scales, George Carr, and Clint Thomas, and signing Oscar Charleston, and Rube Curry in 1924.  The war between the two leagues came to an end in 1924, when they agreed to respect each other's contracts and arranged for the Colored World Series between their champions.

Difficulties and demise 
The NNL survived controversies over umpiring, scheduling, and what some perceived as league president Rube Foster's disproportionate influence and favoritism toward his own team.  It also outlasted Foster's decline into mental illness in 1926, and its eastern rival, the ECL, which folded in early 1928.  The NNL finally fell apart in 1931 under the economic stress of the Great Depression.

Legacy 
The Negro American League, founded in 1937 and including several of the same teams that played in the original Negro National League, would eventually carry on as the western circuit of black baseball. A second Negro National League was organized in 1933, but eventually became concentrated on the east coast.

To distinguish between the two unrelated leagues, they are usually referred to as the first Negro National League (NNL I) and the second Negro National League (NNL II).

Negro National League franchises 
''Annual final standings: 1920, 1921, 1922, 1923, 1924, 1925, 1926, 1927, 1928, 1929, 1930, 1931

 Chicago American Giants (1920–1931) – Known as the Chicago Columbia Giants in 1931; Associate team 1931.
 Chicago Giants (1920–1921)
 Cuban Stars (1920–1930) – Known as the Cincinnati Cubans in 1921.
 Dayton Marcos (1920, 1926)
 Detroit Stars (1920–1931)
 Indianapolis ABCs (1920–1924, 1925–1926) – Dropped from league mid-season 1924 but returned the following season.
 Kansas City Monarchs (1920–1931) – Associate team 1931.
 St. Louis Giants (1920–1921) – Replaced by St. Louis Stars in 1922, which was virtually the same team with new owners.
 St. Louis Stars (1922–1931) – Replaced the St. Louis Giants.
 Columbus Buckeyes (1921)
 Cleveland Tate Stars (1922–1923) – Dropped out mid-season 1923.
 Toledo Tigers (1923) – Mid-season replacement for Cleveland Tate Stars.
 Pittsburgh Keystones (1922)
 Milwaukee Bears (1923)
 Birmingham Black Barons (1924–1925, 1927–1930) – Associate team 1931.
 Cleveland Browns (1924)
 Memphis Red Sox (1924–1925, 1927–1930) – Mid-season replacement in 1924 for Indianapolis ABCs.
 Cleveland Elites (1926) – Closely related to both Cleveland Hornets and Cleveland Tigers.
 Cleveland Hornets (1927) – Closely related to both Cleveland Elites and Cleveland Tigers.
 Cleveland Tigers (1928) – Closely related to both Cleveland Hornets and Cleveland Elites.
 Nashville Elite Giants (1930) – Became Cleveland Cubs for 1931 season.
 Cleveland Cubs (1931) – Returned to Nashville in 1932 after NNL folded.
 Indianapolis ABCs (2nd team) (1931)
 Louisville White Sox (1931)
 Columbus Blue Birds – Associate team 1931.
 Cuban House of David – Associate team 1931.

Member timeline 

1920: Formation of NNL consisting of 8 teams – Chicago American Giants, Detroit Stars, Kansas City Monarchs, Indianapolis ABCs, St. Louis Giants, Cuban Stars, Dayton Marcos and Chicago Giants.
1921: Dropped Dayton Marcos; Added Columbus Buckeyes.
1922: Dropped Columbus Buckeyes, Chicago Giants; Added Cleveland Tate Stars, Pittsburgh Keystones.
1923: Dropped Cleveland Tate Stars (mid-season), Pittsburgh Keystones; Added Toledo Tigers (mid-season), Milwaukee Bears.
1924: Dropped Toledo Tigers, Milwaukee Bears, Indianapolis ABCs (mid-season); Added Cleveland Browns, Birmingham Black Barons, Memphis Red Sox (mid-season).
1925: Dropped Cleveland Browns; Re-added Indianapolis ABCs.
1926: Dropped Memphis Red Sox, Birmingham Black Barons; Added Cleveland Elites, re-added Dayton Marcos.
1927: Dropped Dayton Marcos, Indianapolis ABCs; Re-added Birmingham Black Barons, Memphis Red Sox.
1929: Dropped Cleveland Tigers.
1930: Added Nashville Elite Giants.
1931: Dropped Memphis Red Sox, Birmingham Black Barons, Cuban Stars; Added Louisville White Sox, (new) Indianapolis ABCs. League fell apart before season end.

League champions

Pennant winners 

From 1920 through 1924, the team in first place at the end of the season was declared the Pennant winner.  Due to the unorthodox nature of the schedule (and little incentive to enforce it), some teams frequently played many more games than others did in any given season. This led to some disputed championships and two teams claiming the title. The 1931 season did not finish all games, which meant that while St. Louis was awarded the title, non-member Pittsburgh Crawfords disputed their status as champion. From 1924 to 1927, the pennant champion went to play in the Negro World Series. Generally, the team with the best winning percentage (with some minimum number of games played) was awarded the Pennant, but other times it was the team with the most victories.  The "games behind" method of recording standings was uncommon in most black leagues.

† – Pennant was decided via a split-season schedule with the winner of the first half of the season playing the winner of the second half of the season, unless one team won both halves.

League play-offs 
From 1925 through 1931, the NNL split the season into two halves.  The winner of the first half played the winner of the second half for the league Pennant. As mentioned above, disputes also occurred in the split season finishes. 1929 and 1931 saw Kansas City win both halves.

Colored World Series 

For the duration of the league, a Colored World Series took place four times, from 1924 through 1927. The NNL Pennant winner met the champion of the rival Eastern Colored League. Three out of the four years, the Negro National League team (below in bold) won.

Legend
  Denotes a tied game.

Notes

References 

Negro baseball leagues
Defunct baseball leagues in the United States
African-American sports history
Sports leagues established in 1920
Sports leagues disestablished in 1931
1920 establishments in the United States
1931 disestablishments in the United States